Bandudato is a suco of Aileu subdistrict, Aileu District, East Timor. The administrative area covers an area of 30.65 square kilometres and at the time of the 2010 census it had a population of 1,426 people.

See also
 Sucos of East Timor

References

Populated places in Aileu District
Sucos of East Timor